is a Japanese manga written and illustrated by Takao Yaguchi. The manga was serialised in Kodansha's Weekly Shōnen Magazine from 1973 to 1983. Kodansha has published the manga's 57 bound volumes between July 5, 2003 and October 5, 2005.

The manga was adapted into an 109-episode anime series. Directed by Yoshikata Nitta, the anime's 109 episodes were broadcast on Fuji TV between April 7, 1980 and June 28, 1982. The official English name is Fisherman Sanpei.

As of October 2020, the Fisherman Sanpei manga had over 50 million copies in circulation, making it one of the best-selling manga series.

Characters
Sanpei Mihira (三平三平)
Ippei Mihira (三平 一平)
Gyoshin Ayukawa (鮎川魚紳)
Masaharu Kase (加瀬 正治)
Yuri Takayama (高山 ユリ)

Anime
The anime uses two pieces of theme song.  by MoJo is the series' opening theme, while  also by MoJo is the series' ending theme. An OVA called まんがビデオシリーズ 釣りキチ三平 was released in 2001 on VHS only.

Episode list 
 Monster of Yonaki (夜泣き谷の怪物)
 Blue Crucian Carp of the Caldera  (カルデラの青鮒)
 Wild Koi of Mikazukiko  (三日月湖の野鯉)
 The Mitsumatachi Gang (三ツ又池のギャング)
 The God of Fury Hook  (毛バリの神サマ)
 The Goro Pulling Rascal (ゴロ引きゴンベ)
 Takitaro of O-ike (池の滝太郎)
 The King of The Rock  (磯の王者)
 The Tears of Shiro Itsu (シロギスの涙)
 Saida Iwas Denya (𩹷の原野)
 Meko Iwa (メッコ岩魚の怪)
 The Little Fox Near The Fishing Field (釣り場の子ギツネ)
 Night Catching Kaikatsu (カジカの夜突き)
 The Monster of Sanga Ike (三角瀞の主)
 The Sad Song of Zukiga Field ススキ川原エレジー
 The Sogiyo of Kabura Wata 蕪渡しの草魚
 The Mini Big Game 小さなビッグゲーム
 The Rod of Unrest Soul 怨み竿
 Naboromo Buna of Syunema 幽沼の羽衣鮒
 The weird fishes in old billabong 古沼の大怪魚
 The red crucian in cave billabong おっぽり沼の緋鮒
 The bareheaded in the Bareheaded Bog 坊主沢の沢坊主
 The universal crucian of the Burn Bog 焼沼の宇宙ブナ
 The bomb fish of the Youming beach
 The competition of salmon in Canada 
 The dancer of the lake mountain
 RCフィッシング
 The Sakura and Black Cyprinoid 桜吹雪カラス鯉
 The battle between Raigyo and Kuma-hawk ライギョ対ミサゴ王者の対決
 The Gold Carp
 The Blue Flag Marlin of Hawaii
 The Finger fish in Hand bog 手形沼の指切り魚
 The Dragon of Dragon Waterfall
 蝉しぐれのブラウン
 The Esa fish after the Northwest rain 驟雨のオトリアユ
 Fishing dog Shou Hachi
 The weird rockfish in Shower Valley しぐれ谷の化物イワナ
 The secret technique of River Zhuchuan 簗川流簗秘伝
 Battle of Sanpei Syringe 三平式珍ドウ作戦
 The legend of Ali Crucian お里鮒伝説
 The dream net 茜屋流小鷹網 幻の投網の巻
 Aneka eagle net, Kigawa 茜屋流小鷹網 紀ノ川の巻
 Net in a house; devil but Buddhisms heart. 茜屋流小鷹網 鬼手仏心の巻
 Kluck sound, brawniness ガッチンがん鉄
 Killer of the lake, Black rocket launcher 湖の殺し屋ブラックバス
 Maple leaf dike big rainbow trout 紅葉堤の大ニジマス
 Rintaros great carp 太郎沼の巨鯉
 Fishing mother 1553 フィッシングかあちゃん
 Instruction fish fishing law トモ釣り伝授
 Golden Valleys Gold fish 黄金谷のキンイワナ
 Red Eddy Fish and The Famous Fishing-Rod アカブチと幻の名竿
 Fight Bravely At The Pond Fishing 釣り堀奮戦記
 Fighting Of The Transplantation Of Rock Fish イワナ大移植作戦
 Fishing The Egret Fish In The Ice Cave ワカサギの氷穴釣り
 Red Dragonfly Fishing Method Of 1 Meter Long Dragon Fish 尺バヤのアカネ釣り
 ペンペン釣りとポカン釣り
 Use The Wood Toon To Tooning The Guqi Fish クキのドン突き
 The Big Black Silver Carp 幻の大魚コクレン
 Secret Of The Fire Rock 火の石の謎
 Lakes Monster Of Nian Zhu Lake 念珠湖のネッシー
 Fossil Fishing Way 石化け
 Fighting With Carp 巨鯉釣り大作戦
 Secret Method! Reed Rod 秘技!ススキ釣り
 Gold colour trout - Golden Trout 黄金のマス・ゴールデントラウト
 Enticement Of Aquatic larva ニンフの誘惑
 Odd Fish With Vine Cane Flower Look カラクサ模様の怪魚
 Princess Water 水のプリンセス
 the magician of the brook Mountain Jade 渓流の魔術師ヤマセミ
 The summer of the delicious fish 若鮎たちの夏
 The king of fisherman- The ghost fish 湿原の王者釣り
 Facing Attack Rockfish Catcher 襲われたイワナ密漁者
 Hunters superior... Sansi Lang 熊撃ちマタギの三四郎
 Bulrush fishing-rod to fishing frigid zone Arhat fish 寒バヤのアシ竿釣り
 Chinese Toon Fish Wujinqiu group ドン突き!たまきんトリオ
 Fishing Chinese Toon Fish San Ping secret battle ドン突き!三平（秘）作戦
 Summer Brook - Movement of Sliver crap 春の小川・ギンブナ騒動
 Lower savory fish Rotate Fishing 落鮎のコロガシ釣り
 The Strange Fish was Curse 呪い谷の怪奇魚
 The secret of Flying bird カジカの夜突き・蛍火の謎
 The Struggle of Worm ケダニ先生奮戦記
 Aiko, Spread the Wings! 大空へはばたけ、三平!

Film
It was made into a live action film in 2009, starring Kenta Suga, Takashi Tsukamoto and Yuu Kashii. The official English name of this movie is Sanpei the Fisher Boy.

Videogames
There were two official videogames, made by Cross Media Soft for MSX home computers:
Fisherman Sanpei Blue Marine Edition (釣りキチ三平ブルーマリン編) (1988) 
Tsurikichi Sanpei Tsurisennin Hen (釣りキチ三平釣り仙人編) (1989)

References

External links
 Fisherman Sanpei on Nippon Animation
 

1973 manga
1980 anime television series debuts
Fictional fishers
Fishing in anime and manga
Kodansha manga
Nippon Animation
Shōnen manga